Custer State Park is a South Dakota State Park and wildlife reserve in the Black Hills, United States. The park is South Dakota's largest and first state park, named after Lt. Colonel George Armstrong Custer.

The park is home to a herd of 1,500 bison. Elk, coyotes, mule deer, white tailed deer, mountain goats, prairie dogs, bighorn sheep, river otters, pronghorn, cougars, and feral burros also inhabit the park. The park is known for its scenery, its scenic drives (Needles Highway and the wildlife loop), with views of the bison herd and prairie dog towns. This park is easily accessible by road from Rapid City. Other nearby attractions are Wind Cave National Park, Mount Rushmore, Jewel Cave National Monument, Crazy Horse Memorial, and Badlands National Park.

History
The area originally started out as sixteen sections, but was later changed into one block of land because of the challenges of the terrain. The park began to grow rapidly in the 1920s and gained new land. During the 1930s the Civilian Conservation Corps built miles of roads, laid out parks and campgrounds, and built three dams that set up a future of water recreation at the park. In 1964 an additional  were added to the park.

Annual bison roundup 
The park has an annual bison roundup and auction in September, in which the bison in the park (more than 1,000) are rounded up, with several hundred sold at auction so that the remaining number of animals will be compatible with the rangeland forage.

The annual roundups began in 1965; more than 10,000 people now attend each one.

Museums
The Peter Norbeck Center is listed on the National Register of Historic Places, and is located on U.S. Route 16A in Custer. Exhibits focus on the park's natural history and cultural heritage, and include wildlife dioramas, a CCC bunkhouse and a gold prospecting display. The center is named for South Dakota Governor and Senator Peter Norbeck. Many of the park's naturalist programs begin at the center.

Badger Hole, also known as Badger Clark Historical Site, was the home of Charles Badger Clark (1883–1957), who was named South Dakota's first Poet Laureate in 1937 and was noted for his cowboy poetry. The house is maintained as it was when Clark lived there. Visitors can tour the home and hike the adjacent Badger Clark Historic Trail.

Opened in May 2016, Custer State Park's visitor center has information on the animals of the park, as well as a 20-minute film detailing the history and layout of the park.

Begging Burros

Begging Burros refers to the donkeys in Custer State Park. For many years, these donkeys have approached cars begging for food.

The Begging Burros inhabit one area of the park upon a hill where approximately 15 of them try to obtain any food they can. Custer State Park's roadway is often blocked off by these animals, so it is advised to exercise caution and patience when encountering them.

In popular culture

Movies filmed in Custer State Park, include The Last Hunt (1956), How the West Was Won (1962) and A Man Called Horse (1970).

U.S. President Calvin Coolidge and his wife Grace vacationed at Custer State Park for several weeks during the summer of 1927. In nearby Rapid City, where he had his summer office, Coolidge announced to assembled reporters that he would not seek reelection in 1928.

See also
 Conservation of American bison
 List of protected grasslands of North America
List of South Dakota state parks

References

External links

Custer State Park - Official Site
Custer State Park Resort
Tatanka: The 2011 Guide to Custer State Park
Badger Clark Memorial Society

State parks of South Dakota
Black Hills
Protected areas of Custer County, South Dakota
Nature centers in South Dakota
Presidency of Calvin Coolidge
Protected areas established in 1912
1912 establishments in South Dakota
Civilian Conservation Corps in South Dakota
Bison herds
Grasslands of South Dakota